Legend of Fei (有翡) is a 2020 Chinese historical drama based on Priest's novel Bandits (有匪). It was directed by Wu Jingyuan and stars Zhao Liying as Zhou Fei and Wang Yibo as Xie Yun. The series tells the growth story of the female warrior Zhou Fei through her adventure with itinerant poet and traveler Xie Yun, in a time when the influence and power of the martial arts world is on decline and in turmoil because a great secret, which has been buried for twenty years, is about to be uncovered. The storyline is unique as it is oriented towards the female standpoint in martial arts world, which has typically empowered the male characters.

The show was premiered on the Hubei TV Channel on December 15, 2020, and then was exclusively broadcast on Tencent Video and WeTV on December 16 of the same year. For standard account on Tencent Video, the show aired one episode daily at 20:00 CST from Monday through Sunday, from December 16, 2020 to February 03, 2021.

Synopsis 
Many years ago, there was chaos in the realm of Jianghu. A famous swordsman named Li Zheng (Hu Bing) established the 48 Strongholds to fight against the evils and protect the commons, but after his death, the popular Jianghu sects lost prominence. Li Zheng's daughter Li Jinrong (Che Xiao) took over the sects and married Zhou Yitang (Zong Fengyan). Their daughter, Zhou Fei (Zhao Liying) grew up in a safe but isolated home. Sick of being confined to the place of her birth, Zhou Fei longed to escape and made repeated efforts to get away. But her life took a great turn when she almost drowned while saving her cousin and was only saved by a free-spirited young martial arts master named Xie Yun (Wang Yibo). Their special relationship started from then. They decided to hone their fighting skills together when meeting again after Zhou Fei gained permission to descend the mountains and go on a mission. While fighting against Disha Manor and other evil forces, the relationship between Zhou Fei and Xie Yun started to develop. With new martial arts masters met along the way, they began to unearth secrets, including that of Xie Yun’s true identity and the treasure that had been hidden for several years by the previous dynasty.

Cast

Main cast
Zhao Liying as Zhou Fei
Wang Yibo as Xie Yun/Anzhi/Xiao Chuan/Qian Suiyou

The 48 Strongholds

Hu Bing as Li Zheng (Zhou Fei's grandfather) (South Blade)
Che Xiao as Li Jinrong (Zhou Fei's mother)
Zong Fengyan as Zhou Yitang (Zhou Fei's father)
Chen Ruoxuan as Li Sheng (Zhou Fei's cousin)
Zhou Jieqiong as Li Yan (Zhou Fei's cousin)
Wang Chunyuan as Yu Lao
Yuan Yizi as Kou Dan
Yan Linfei as Ma Jili/Uncle Ma
Feng Jun as Old Madame Wang

Others

Zhang Huiwen as Wu Chuchu
Zhang Xinyu as Yang Jin
Sun Jian as Yin Pei
Leng Jiyuan as "Poisoner" Ying Hecong
Dong Xuan as Duan Jiuniang
Wang Wanjuan as Lady Nishang
Ruan Shengwen as Ji Yunchen (North Blade)
Li Duo as Mr. Bai (Route gang elder)
Zheng Xiaodong as Yin Wenlan (Mountain Blade)
Frankie Guo as Mu Xiaoqiao (Phoenix Master)
Wang Xinqiao as Zhou Chen
Ma Jinwen as Master Tong Ming
Yang Chengming as Huo Liantao

Disha Manor

Geng Le as Shen Tianshu
Dai Xiaoying as Hu Tianying
Wang Huilai as Lu Tiankuang
Wei Binghua as Tong Tianyang
Jing Gangshan as Chu Tianyu
Chen Yutong as Chou Tianjin
Fan Zhechen as Gu Tianxian

Political characters
Wang Xiuzhe as Yuwen Zhi
Wang Li as Wang Lin
Leon Li as Wen Yu
Zhang Jiashuo as Chen Zichen

Reception
On China Tencent Video platform, "Legend of Fei" reached a record of over 130 million views within only the first 8 hours of release and 4 billion views in just over 1 month. When the drama series ended in February 2021, although all the episodes except the first two had already been locked by Tencent, the number of views still achieved a record of 5.12 billion on the exclusive domestic platform. "Legend of Fei" is also popular overseas, gaining Top 1 spot on WeTV Thailand and WeTV Philippines after only 1 week of simultaneous release.

Awards and nominations

Original Soundtrack

References

2020 Chinese television series debuts
Television shows based on Chinese novels
Television series by Tencent Pictures
Chinese fantasy television series